Primary energy use in Slovakia was 194 TWh and 36 TWh per million inhabitants in 2009.

Overview 

Slovakia is a net energy importer. The share of import was 63% of the primary energy use in 2009. (IEA Key stats 2010 pages 52)

Fossil fuels

Oil
Slovnaft is the largest oil refinery in Slovakia.

Natural gas 
Slovenský plynárenský priemysel (Slovak Gas Industry) is the main natural gas supplier in Slovakia.

Nuclear Energy

Four operating reactors in two power plants (Bohunice Nuclear Power Plant and Mochovce Nuclear Power Plant) produced 14,42 TW·h in 2014. Three other reactors at Bohunice are in permanent shutdown. Two other reactors are under construction at Mochovce.

Renewable energy 

There is hydropower potential in Vah and Orava rivers (before Stary Hrad, and after Kralovianski Meander, Oravka tunnel), with power plants over 30MW as extremely profitable (for low cost/installed MW).

Wind power 
In the end of 2010 wind power capacity in Slovakia 3 MW was the lowest of the EU countries, except Malta and Slovenia, as the potential is extremely low (the wind starts to move the turbine over 4 km/h, and the winds in Slovakia are just under 4 km/h). EWEA's targets are to produce 14-17% of the EU's electricity with wind power in 2020, and save €28 billion a year in fuel costs in Europe.

Climate change
Emissions of carbon dioxide in total, per capita in 2007 were 6.8 tons CO2 compared to EU 27 average 7.9 tons . Emission change 2007/1990 (%) was -35.1%. In Europe in 2007 the Slovak emissions of carbon dioxide per capita (6.8 tons CO2) were higher than in Hungary 5.4, Sweden 5.1, Portugal 5.2 or Switzerland 5.6 and lower than in Czech Republic 11.8, Luxembourg 22.4, Finland 12.2, Netherlands 11.1, Germany 9.7 or Ireland 10.1

1990 emissions were 74 Mt  eq. The Kyoto protocol target is reduction of 6 Mt (-8%).

See also 

 2009 Handlová mine blast
 List of power stations in Slovakia
 Renewable energy by country

References